Endangered is the 8th studio album by hard rock band Pink Cream 69.

Track listing

Personnel
David Readman – vocals
Alfred Koffler – guitar
Dennis Ward – bass
Kosta Zafiriou – drums

Production
Dennis Ward – mixing, engineering

References

External links
Heavy Harmonies page

2001 albums
Pink Cream 69 albums
Massacre Records albums
Albums produced by Dennis Ward (musician)